Asanovo is a rural locality (a village) in Yusvinskoye Rural Settlement, Yusvinsky District, Perm Krai, Russia. The population was 22 as of 2010. There is 1 street.

Geography 
Asanovo is located 4 km southwest of Yusva (the district's administrative centre) by road. Pakhomovo is the nearest rural locality.

References 

Rural localities in Yusvinsky District